East Haven is a town in Essex County, Vermont, United States. The population was 270 at the 2020 census. It is part of the Berlin, NH–VT Micropolitan Statistical Area. The town also contains the village of Hartwellville.

Geography
According to the United States Census Bureau, the town has a total area of 37.4 square miles (96.9 km2), all land.

Kingdom Trails Association 
In the Summer of 2018 an expansion network of mountain bike trails were built by KTA on the property owned by Walter and Winny Norman.  The network of trails called Moose Haven have a trail-head located adjacent to East Haven's municipal buildings. The trails consist of a primary fire road (Haul Road) that serves as the climbing trail (approx. 700 feet of vertical) with several flowy, gravity fed trails that extend off of it.  Stormin Norman and Black Bear are the longest and most commonly ridden trails of Moose Haven; they feature large berms, natural features and several jumps, gaps, and rollers.   The terrain is focused for primarily advanced riders, but can be enjoyed by intermediate riders.

Demographics

As of the census of 2000, there were 301 people, 119 households, and 91 families residing in the town.  The population density was 8.0 people per square mile (3.1/km2).  There were 173 housing units at an average density of 4.6 per square mile (1.8/km2).  The racial makeup of the town was 97.01% White, 1.33% African American, 1.00% Asian, 0.33% from other races, and 0.33% from two or more races. Hispanic or Latino of any race were 0.66% of the population.

There were 119 households, out of which 37.8% had children under the age of 18 living with them, 64.7% were married couples living together, 8.4% had a female householder with no husband present, and 23.5% were non-families. 18.5% of all households were made up of individuals, and 5.9% had someone living alone who was 65 years of age or older.  The average household size was 2.53 and the average family size was 2.82.

In the town, the population was spread out, with 24.9% under the age of 18, 6.0% from 18 to 24, 28.6% from 25 to 44, 29.6% from 45 to 64, and 11.0% who were 65 years of age or older.  The median age was 37 years. For every 100 females, there were 96.7 males.  For every 100 females age 18 and over, there were 98.2 males.

The median income for a household in the town was $34,375, and the median income for a family was $36,094. Males had a median income of $32,292 versus $19,500 for females. The per capita income for the town was $13,330.  About 13.8% of families and 18.6% of the population were below the poverty line, including 23.4% of those under the age of eighteen and 7.3% of those 65 or over.

See also

 Lyndonville Air Force Station

References

External links 

Towns in Vermont
Berlin, New Hampshire micropolitan area
Towns in Essex County, Vermont